Cahokia High School is a public high school in Cahokia Heights, Illinois, United States that is part of the Cahokia Unit School District 187.

History
In 2013 the district announced that due to budget issues it planned to eliminate athletic programs. This would have eliminated Cahokia High School's programs. In June of that year the district board voted 6-0 to keep athletics and arts programs, but at the same time it voted to close two schools and consolidate other academic programs. Therefore the high school retained its academic programs.

Academics
Eighty percent of Cahokia's graduates enroll in college or post-graduate training programs.

Demographics
As of 2006, the student body of the school was 85.1% black, 13.8% white, 0.9% Hispanic and 0.2% Asian/Pacific Islander.

Notable alumni
 Terron Armstead, professional football player in the National Football League (NFL)
 Byron Gettis, professional baseball player in Major League Baseball
 Richard Stilwell, Class of 1960, professional opera singer who has performed at the Metropolitan Opera, internationally, and in film.

References

External links
 Cahokia High School 
 Cahokia High School (Archive: 2010-2012)
 Cahokia High School (Archive: 1999-2009)
 

Public high schools in Illinois
Schools in St. Clair County, Illinois
Educational institutions established in 1952
1952 establishments in Illinois